Narberth railway station serves the town of Narberth, Pembrokeshire, Wales.

Services 
On Summer Saturdays a Great Western Railway service calls en route to Pembroke Dock, and again on its way back to London Paddington.

References

External links 

Railway stations in Pembrokeshire
DfT Category F2 stations
Former Great Western Railway stations
Railway stations in Great Britain opened in 1866
Railway stations served by Great Western Railway
Railway stations served by Transport for Wales Rail
Railway request stops in Great Britain
1866 establishments in Wales
railway station